The National Outdoor Book Award (NOBA) was formed in 1997 as an American-based non-profit program which each year presents awards honoring the best in outdoor writing and publishing. It is housed at Idaho State University and chaired by Ron Watters. It is sponsored by the National Outdoor Book Awards Foundation, Idaho State University and the Association of Outdoor Recreation and Education. As of 2021, awards have been presented in 13 categories, although not all categories are awarded in any given year. 

The award is announced in early November of each year. Winning books are promoted nationally and are entitled to display the National Outdoor Book Award gold medallion.

Winners and honorable mentions (Silver Medals)
Small date (2010 vs 2010 ) = Honorable Mention or Silver Medal (Starting in 2021, "Silver medals" replaced honorable mentions. They are awarded when the two top books in a category score within a slim margin of each other. Ties are also sometimes awarded.)

Outdoor literature (non-fiction)
1997: Don Gayton, Landscapes of the Interior: Re-Explorations of Nature and the Human Spirit
1997: W. Scott Olsen and Scott Cairns, The Sacred Place: Witnessing the Holy in the Physical World
1998: Greg Child, Postcards from the Ledge: Collected Mountaineering Writings of Greg Child
1999: Richard Bangs, The Lost River:  A Memoir of Life, Death, and Transformation on Wild Water
2000: Chris Duff, On Celtic Tides: One Man's Journey Around Ireland by Sea Kayak
2001: Erika Warmbrunn, Where the Pavement Ends:  One Woman's Bicycle Trip Through Mongolia, China and Vietnam
2002: Jill Fredston, Rowing to Latitude: Journeys Along the Arctic's Edge
2003: Joe Simpson, The Beckoning Silence
2004: Maria Coffey, Where the Mountain Casts Its Shadow: The Dark Side of Extreme Adventure
2004: Ted Kerasote, Out There: In the Wild in a Wired Age
2004: Angela & Duffy Ballard, A Blistered Kind of Love: One Couple's Trial by Trail
2005: Jennifer Jordan, Savage Summit:  The True Stories of the First Five Women Who Climbed K2, the World's Most Feared Mountain
2005: Peter Stark, At the Mercy of the River:  An Exploration of the Last African Wilderness
2006: Karsten Heuer, Being Caribou: Five Months on Foot with a Caribou Herd
2007: Lou Ureneck, Backcast: Fatherhood, Fly-fishing, and a River Journey Through the Heart of Alaska 
2007: Beth A. Leonard, Blue Horizons: Dispatches from Distant Seas
2008: Jennifer Lowe-Anker, Forget Me Not: A Memoir
2009: Mark Obmascik, Halfway to Heaven: My White-knuckled--and Knuckleheaded--Quest for the Rocky Mountain High
2009: Julie Angus, Rowboat in a Hurricane: My Amazing Journey Across a Changing Ocean
2010: Peter Heller, Kook: What Surfing Taught Me About Love, Life and Catching the Perfect Wave
2010: Winton Porter, Just Passin' Thru: A Vintage Store, the Appalachian Trail, and a Cast of Unforgettable Characters
2011: Philip Connors, Fire Season: Field Notes from a Wilderness Lookout 
2012: Suzanne Roberts, Almost Somewhere: Twenty-Eight Days on the John Muir Trail
2012: Jim Davidson and Kevin Vaughan, The Ledge: An Adventure Story of Friendship and Survival on Mount Rainier
2012: Michael Lanza, Before They're Gone:  A Family's Year-Long Quest to Explore America's Most Endangered National Parks
2013: Gail D. Storey, I Promise Not to Suffer:  A Fool for Love Hikes the Pacific Crest Trail
2013: Dylan Tomine, Closer to the Ground: An Outdoor Family’s Year on the Water, in the Woods and at the Table
2014: Erin McKittrick, Small Feet, Big Land:  Adventure, Home and Family on the Edge of Alaska
2015: Jennifer Kingsley, Paddlenorth:  Adventure, Resilience and Renewal in the Arctic Wild
2015: Kelly Cordes, The Tower:  A Chronicle of Climbing and Controversy on Cerro Torre 

 2016: Debbie Clarke Moderow, Fast Into the Night:  A Woman, Her Dogs, and Their Journey North on the Iditarod Trail
2016: Sue Leaf, Portage: A Family, a Canoe and the Search for the Good Life
2017: John Gierach, A Fly Rod of Your Own
2017: Robert Moor, On Trails: An Exploration
2017: Erik Weihenmayer and Buddy Levy, No Barriers: A Blind Man's Journey to Kayak the Grand Canyon
2018: Annette McGivney, Pure Land: A True Story of Three Lives and the Search for Heaven on Earth
2019: Geoff Power, Inner Ranges: An Anthology of Mountain Thoughts 
2019: Dave Shively The Pacifc Alone: The Untold Story of Kayaking's Boldest Voyage 
2019: Raynor Winn, The Salt Path
2020: Edward Power, Dragons in the Snow: Avalanche Detectives and the Race to Beat Death in the Mountains 
2021: Trina Moyles, Lookout: Love, Solitude and Searching for Wildfire in the Boreal Forest 
2021: Mark Kurlansky, The Unreasonable Virtue of Fly Fishing 
2021: Sara Dykman, Bicycling with Butterflies: My 10,201 Mile Journey Following the Monarch Migration
2022: Doug Peacock Was it Worth It?  A Wilderness Warrior’s Long Trail Home
2022: Dylan Tomine, "Headwaters: The Adventures, Obsession, and Evolution of a Fly Fisherman"

Outdoor literature (fiction)
2015: Kim Heacox, Jimmy Bluefeather: A Novel
2022: Amy McCulloch, Breathless:  A Thriller

Journeys (inaugurated 2021) 

 2021: Anders Morley, This Land of Snow:  A Journey Across the North in Winter
 2021: Karen Berger, photographs by Bart Smith, America's Great Historic Trails: Walking the Trails of History
 2022: Marina Richie, Halcyon Journey:  In Search of the Belted Kingfisher

History/biography
1997: [no award]
1998: Vince Welch, Cort Conley and Brad Dimock, The Doing of the Thing: The Brief, Brilliant Whitewater Career of Buzz Holmstrom
1999: Sam Keith from the journals and photographs of Richard Proenneke, One Man's Wilderness: An Alaskan Odyssey
2000: Peter & Leni Gillman, The Wildest Dream: The Biography of George Mallory
2001: Donald Worster, A River Running West: The Life of John Wesley Powell
2001: Brad Dimock, Sunk Without a Sound: The Tragic Colorado Honeymoon of Glen and Bessie Hyde 
2002: Char Miller, Gifford Pinchot and the Making of Modern Environmentalism
2002: Jonathan Waterman, Arctic Crossing: One Man's 2,200 Mile Odyssey Among the Inuit
2003: Chris Duff, Southern Exposure: A Solo Sea Kayaking Journey Around New Zealand's South Island
2003: Rebecca A. Brown, Women on High: Pioneers of Mountaineering
2004: Andy Selters, Ways to the Sky: A Historical Guide to North American Mountaineering
2005: Neal Petersen with William P. Baldwin and Patty Fulcher, Journey of a Hope Merchant: From Apartheid to the Elite World of Solo Yacht Racing
2005: Arlene Blum, Breaking Trail: A Climbing Life 
2006: Eric Blehm, The Last Season
2007: Brad Dimock, The Very Hard Way: Bert Loper and the Colorado River
2007: James M. Tabor, Forever on the Mountain: The Truth Behind One of Mountaineering's Most Controversial and Mysterious Disasters
2008: Maurice Isserman and Stewart Weaver, Fallen Giants: A History of Himalayan Mountaineering from the Age of Empire to the Age of Extremes
2008: Elias Butler and Tom Myers, Grand Obsession: Harvey Butchart and the Exploration of the Grand Canyon
2009: Douglas Brinkley, Wilderness Warrior: Theodore Roosevelt and the Crusade for America
2010: Joseph E. Taylor III, Pilgrims of the Vertical: Yosemite Rock Climbers & Nature at Risk
2010: Jennifer Jordan, The Last Man on the Mountain: The Death of an American Adventurer on K2
2010: Glyn Williams, Arctic Labyrinth: The Quest for the Northwest Passage
2011: Dominic Gill, Take a Seat: One Man, One Tandem and Twenty Thousand Miles of Possibilities
2011: Edward J. Larson, An Empire of Ice: Scott, Shackleton, and the Heroic Age of Antarctic Science
2012: Peter Zuckerman and Amanda Padoan, Buried in the Sky: The Extraordinary Story of the Sherpa Climbers on K2's Deadliest Day
2012: Jo Deurbrouck, Anything Worth Doing: A True Story of Adventure, Friendship and Tragedy on the Last of the West's Great Rivers
2013: Kevin Fedarko, The Emerald Mile: The Epic Story of the Fastest Ride in History Through the Heart of the Grand Canyon
2014: Ben Montgomery, Grandma Gatewood's Walk: The Inspiring Story of the Woman Who Saved the Appalachian Trail
2015: Sean Prentiss, Finding Abbey: The Search for Edward Abbey and His Hidden Desert Grave
2016: Mick Conefrey, The Ghosts of K2: The Epic Saga of the First Ascent
2016: Maurice Isserman, Continental Divide: A History of American Mountaineering
2016: Glen Denny, Valley Walls: A Memoir of Climbing & Living in Yosemite
2017: Bernadette McDonald, Art of Freedom: The Life and Climbs of Voytek Kurtyka
2018: Edward J. Larson, To the Edges of the Earth: 1909, the Race for the Three Poles
2018: Max McCoy, Elevations: A Personal Exploration of the Arkansas River
2019: Julie Hauserman: Drawn to the Deep: The Remarkable Underwater Explorations of Wes Skiles
2019: John Taliaferro, Grinnell: America's Environmental Pioneer and his Restless Drive to Save the West 
2020: Scott Ellsworth, The World Beneath Their Feet: Mountaineering Madness and the Deadly Race to Summit the Himalayas
2020: Buddy Levy, Labyrinth of Ice: The Triumphant and Tragic Greely Polar Expedition 
2021: Jennifer Hull, Shook: An Earthquake, a Legendary Mountain Guide, and Everest’s Deadliest Day
2022: Rick Ridgeway, A Life Lived Wild:  Adventures at the Edge of the Map
2022: Lowell Skoog, Written in the Snows:  Across Time on Skis in the Pacific Northwest

Outdoor classic
1997: [no award]
1998: Don Graydon and Kurt Hanson, Mountaineering: The Freedom of the Hills
1998: Margaret Murie, Two in the Far North
1999: John J. Rowlands, Henry B. Kane (illus.), Cache Lake Country:  Life in the North Woods
2000: Aldo Leopold, A Sand County Almanac
2001: Roderick Nash, Wilderness and the American Mind
2002: Laura Waterman and Guy Waterman, Backwoods Ethics: A Guide to Low-Impact Camping and Hiking
2003: Richard E. Byrd, Alone
2004: Henry David Thoreau, Jeffrey S. Cramer (ed.), Walden
2005: Lifetime Achievement Recognition: Farley Mowat for Sea of Slaughter, Never Cry Wolf and other works.
2006: P. G. Downes, Sleeping Island:  A Journey to the Edge of the Barrens
2007: Donald Culross Peattie, A Natural History of North American Trees
2008: Thomas Winnett, Ben Schifrin, Jeffrey Schaffer, Ruby Johnson Jenkins and Andy Selters, Pacific Crest Trail (series). In three volumes: Southern California, Northern California and Oregon & Washington
2008: Ellsworth L. Kolb, Through the Grand Canyon from Wyoming to Mexico
2009: William Nealy, Kayak: The New Frontier
2009: Steve Sherman and Julia Older, Appalachian Odyssey: Walking the Trail from Georgia to Maine
2010: Maurice Herzog, Annapurna: First Conquest of an 8,000-Meter Peak
2011: Lifetime Achievement Recognition: John Muir for My First Summer in the Sierra and other works.
2012: [no award]
2013: Thomas F. Hornbein, Everest: The West Ridge
2014: Nicholas Howe, Not Without Peril: 150 Years of Misadventure on the Presidential Range of New Hampshire
2015: Ernest Thompson Seton, Wahb: The Biography of a Grizzly
2016: Michael P. Ghiglieri and Thomas M. Myers, Over the Edge: Death in Grand Canyon
2017: Kenn Kaufman, Kingbird Highway:  The Biggest Year in the Life of an Extreme Birder
2018: Claudia Pearson (editor), Mike Clelland (illus.), NOLS Cookery
2019: Mark Elbroch and Casey McFarland, Mammal Tracks and Sign: A Guide to North American Species
2020: Kim Heacox, The Only Kayak:  A Journey Into the Heart of Alaska 
2021: Elizabeth Wenk and Mike White, Sierra South / Sierra North
2022: Steve Roper, Camp 4: Recollections of a Yosemite Rockclimber

Nature and the environment
1997: [no award]
1998: Tim Palmer, The Columbia: Sustaining a Modern Resource
1998: L. David Mech, The Arctic Wolf: Ten Years with the Pack
1999: Tim McNulty, Pat O'Hara (photographs), Washington's Mount Rainier National Park: A Centennial Celebration
1999: Phillip Manning, Islands of Hope: Lessons from North America's Great Wildlife Sanctuaries
2000: Terry Grosz, Wildlife Wars: The Life and Times of a Fish and Game Warden
2000: Kevin Schafer, Penguin Planet: Their World, Our World
2001: Andrew Beattie and Paul R. Ehrlich, Wild Solutions: How Biodiversity is Money in the Bank
2001: Terry Grosz, For Love of Wildness: The Journal of a U.S. Game Management Agent
2001: Douglas Steakley, Ric Masten (poetry), Pacific Light: Images of the Monterey Peninsula
2002: Ted Steinberg, Down to Earth: Nature's Role in American History
2002: Alexandra Morton, Listening to Whales:  What the Orcas Have Taught Us
2002: Thomas Wiewandt and Maureen Wilks, The Southwest Inside Out: An Illustrated Guide to the Land and Its History
2003: Gregory S. Stone, Ice Island: Expedition to Antarctica's Largest Iceberg
2004: Kenneth G. Libbrecht, Patricia Rasmussen (photography), The Snowflake: Winter's Secret Beauty
2005: James R. Spotila, Sea Turtles: A Complete Guide to Their Biology, Behavior, and Conservation
2006: David Attenborough, Life in the Underground
2006: David Zurick and  Julsun Pacheco, Illustrated Atlas of the Himalaya
2006: Wayne Ranney, Carving Grand Canyon: Evidence, Theories, and Mystery
2007: Sophie A. H. Osborn, Condors in Canyon Country: The Return of the California Condor to the Grand Canyon Region
2007: Francis Latreille, White Paradise: Journeys to the North Pole
2008: Steven Kazlowski, The Last Polar Bear: Facing the Truth of a Warming World
2008: Wayne Grady, The Great Lakes: The Natural History of a Changing Region
2009: Yann Arthus-Bertrand, Our Living Earth
2009: Michael Welland, Sand: The Never Ending Story
2010: Mark W. Moffett, Adventures Among Ants: A Global Safari With a Cast of Trillions
2011: Nancy Ross Hugo, Robert Llewellyn (photo), Seeing Trees: Discover the Extraordinary Secrets of Everyday Trees
2012: Michael Collier, The Melting Edge:  Alaska at the Frontier of Climate Change
2012: Carol Gracie, Spring Wildflowers of the Northeast:  A Natural History
2012: Andrew E. Derocher, Wayne Lynch (photo), Polar Bears: A Complete Guide to Their Biology and Behavior
2013: Krista Schlyer, Continental Divide: Wildlife, People and the Border Wall
2013: Nancy Bauer, The California Wildlife Habitat Garden: How to Attract Bees, Butterflies, Birds and Other Animals
2013: David Moskowitz, Wolves in the Land of Salmon
2014: Bruce L. Smith, Life on the Rocks:  A Portrait of the American Mountain Goat
2014: Stan Tekiela, Feathers: A Beautiful Look at a Bird's Most Unique Feature
2015: Tony Angell, The House of Owls
2015: Noah Wilson-Rich, The Bee: A Natural History
2015: Errol Fuller, The Passenger Pigeon
2016: Lori Weidenhammer, Victory Gardens for Bees: A DIY Guide to Saving the Bees
2017: Anurag Agrawal, Monarchs and Milkweed
2017: Günther Bloch, The Pipestone Wolves:  The Rise and Fall of a Wolf Family
2018: Alvin R. Breisch, Matt Patterson (illus.), The Snake and the Salamander:  Reptiles and Amphibians from Maine to Virginia
2019: Krista Schlyer, River of Redemption: Almanac of Life on the Anacostia 
2020: David A. Steen, Secrets of Snakes: The Science Beyond the Myths. 
2020: Tim Palmer, America's Great Mountain Trails: 100 Highcountry Hikes of a Lifetime 
2021: Lynda V. Mapes, Orca: Shared Waters, Shared Home
2022: Pete McBride,  Seeing the Silence: The Beauty of the World’s Most Quiet Places

Natural history literature
1997-2004: [no award]
2005: Alan Burdick, Out of Eden: An Odyssey of Ecological Invasion 
2006: John Nielsen, Condor: To the Brink and Back
2007: Robert Michael Pyle, Sky Time in Gray's River: Living for Keeps in a Forgotten Place
2007: Michael Punke, Last Stand: George Bird Grinnell, the Battle to Save the Buffalo, and the Birth of the New West
2008: Susan Freinkel, The American Chestnut: The Life, Death, and Rebirth of a Perfect Tree
2009: Rob Dunn, Every Living Thing: Man's Obsessive Quest to Catalog Life, from Nanobacteria to New Monkeys
2010: Anders Halverson, An Entirely Synthetic Fish: How Rainbow Trout Beguiled America and Overran the World
2010: Elisabeth Tova Bailey, The Sound of a Wild Snail Eating
2011: Bill Belleville, Salvaging the Real Florida: Lost and Found in the State of Dreams
2012: David George Haskell, The Forest Unseen: A Year's Watch in Nature
2013: Aarin Hirsh, Telling Our Way to the Sea:  A Voyage of Discovery in the Sea of Cortez
2013: Akiko Busch, The Incidental Steward: Reflections on Citizen Science
2014: Julian Hoffman, The Small Heart of Things: Being at Home in a Beckoning World
2015: Diane Ackerman, The Human Age: The World Shaped By Us
2015: Helen Macdonald, H is for Hawk
2016: Drew Harvell, A Sea of Glass:  Searching for the Blaschkas’ Fragile Legacy in an Ocean at Risk
2017: Jonathan White, Tides:  The Science and Spirit of the Ocean
2018: Bernd Heinrich, A Naturalist at Large: The Best Essays of Bernd Heinrich
2018: Elizabeth Rush, Rising: Dispatches from the New American Shore
2019: Peter Wohlleben, The Secret Wisdom of Nature: Trees, Animals, and All Living Things 
2019: Robert Macfarlane, Underland: A Deep Time Journey
2019:  Christopher Ketcham, This Land: How Cowboys, Capitalism, are Ruining the American West 
2020: Patrik Svensson, The Book of Eels: Our Enduring Fascination with the Most Mysterious Creature in the Natural World  
2021: Suzanne Simard, Finding the Mother Tree: Discovering the Wisdom of the Forest 
2021: Jonathan Balcombe, Super Fly: The Unexpected Lives of the World’s Most Successful Insects 
2021:  Helen Macdonald, Vesper Flights
2022: Seth Kantner, A Thousand Trails Home: Living with Caribou

Children's
1997: [no award]
1998: [no award]
1999: Mary Wallace, The Inuksuk Book
2000: Twig C. George, Jellies: The Life of Jellyfish
2000: Ann Dixon, Evon Zerbetz (illus.), Blueberry Shoe
2001: Nancy White Carlstrom, Tim Ladwig (illus.), What Does the Sky Say?
2001: Bruce Hiscock, Coyote and Badger: Desert Hunters of the Southwest
2002: Jane Yolen, Jason Stemple (photos), Wild Wings: Poems for Young People
2002: Mia Posada, Ladybugs: Red, Fiery and Bright
2003: Gloria Whelan, Gijsbert van Frankenhuyzen (illus.), Jam & Jelly by Holly & Nellie
2003: Ellen Stoll Walsh, Dot and Jabber and the Big Bug Mystery 
2004: Mary Ann Hoberman, Jane Dyer (illus.), Whose Garden Is It?
2005: Sharon Lovejoy, The Little Green Island with a Little Red House:  A Book of Colors and Critters
2005: Lois Ehlert, The Leaf Man
2006: Robbyn Smith van Frankenhuysen, Gijsbert van Frankenhuysen (illus.), Kelly of Hazel Ridge
2006: Lee Welles, Gaia Girls Enter the Earth
2007: Roland Smith, Peak
2008: Eric Walters, The Pole
2009: Laura Goering, Whistling Wings
2009: S. Terrell French, Operation Redwood
2010: Ginger Wadsworth, Karen Dugan (illus.), Camping With the President
2010: Mary Morton Cowan, Captain Mac: The Life of Donald Baxter MacMillan, Arctic Explorer
2011: Nikki McClure, To Market, To Market
2011: Judy Burris and Wayne Richards, The Secret Lives of Backyard Bugs
2012: Peggy Thomas, Laura Jacques (illus.), For the Birds: The Life of Roger Tory Peterson
2013: Patti Wheeler and Keith Hemstreet, Travels with Gannon and Wyatt: Botswana
2013: Stacy Tornio and Ken Keffer, The Kid's Outdoor Adventure Book: 448 Great Things to Do in Nature Before You Grow Up
2014: Elizabeth S. Varnai, Kate Hartley (illus.), Good Morning Loon
2015: Nancy Plain, This Strange Wilderness: The Life and Art of John James Audubon
2016: Sharon Mentyka, Chasing at the Surface:  A Novel
2016: Mary Casanova, Wake Up, Island
2017: Jonathan London,  Sean London (illus.), Pup the Sea Otter
2017: Monica Russo, Kevin Byron (photos), Treecology: 30 Activities and Observations for Exploring the World of Trees and Forests
2018: Wendy Gorton, Oregon & Washington 50 Hikes With Kids
2018: Rob Bierregaard, Kate Garchinsky (illus.), Belle's Journey: An Osprey Takes Flight
2018: Stan Tekiela, Elleyna Ruud (illus.), The Kid’s Guide to Birds of Minnesota
2019 Stacy Tornio, Jack Tornio, 101 Outdoor Adventures to Have Before You Grow Up
2019: Julie Bertagna, William Goldsmith (illus.), Wildheart: The Daring Adventures of John Muir
2019:  Phyllis Root, The Lost Forest
2020: Monica Wiedel-Lubinski and Karen Madigan: Nature Play Workshop for Families: A Guide to 40+ Outdoor Learning Experiences in All Seasons
2021: Matt Ritter, illustrations by Nayl Gonzalez, Something Wonderful
2022: Susan Ewing,illustrations by Evon Zerbetz, Alaska is for the Birds!  Fourteen Favorite Feathered Friends.

Design and artistic merit
1997: Darcy Williamson, Larry Milligan (cover art), Teresa Sales (design), The Rocky Mountain Foods Cookbook
1998: Maurice Hornocker, Andy Lewis (art dir.), Tom Lewis (design), Track of the Tiger
1998: Ira Spring, Harvey Manning, Jennifer Shontz (graphics), Marge Mueller (cartography), 100 Classic Hikes in Washington
1999: Leonard Adkins, Joe Cook and Monica Cook (photo), Grant M. Tatum (director), Wildflowers of the Appalachian Trail
1999: Hanneke Ippisch, Hedvig Rappe-Flowers (illus.), Kim Ericsson (design), Kathleen Ort (ed.), Spotted Bear: A Rocky Mountain Folktale *2008: Guy Motil, Surfboards
2000: Bradford Washburn (photo), Antony Decaneas (ed.), Bradford Washburn: Mountain Photography
2001: Art Wolfe, The Living Wild
2002: Stephen Kirkpatrick (photo), Marlo Carter Kirkpatrick (text), Heidi Flynn Allen (design), Wilder Mississippi 
2002: Craig Childs, Mary Winkelman Velgos (design), Peter Ensenberger (photo), The Southwest's Contrary Land: Forever Changing Between Four Corners and the Sea of Cortes 
2003: Tom Blagden, Jr. (photo), Charles R. Tyson, Jr., First Light: Acadia National Park and Maine's Mount Desert Island 
2004: Michael Collier (photo), Rose Houk (text), Mary Winkelmann Velgos (design), The Mountains Know Arizona
2004: Art Wolfe (photo), Art Davidson, Edge of the Earth, Corner of the Sky
2005: John Fielder, Mark Mulvany (design), Mountain Ranges of Colorado
2006: Tom Vezo (photo), Chuck Hagner, Wings of Spring: Courtship, Nesting and Fledging
2006: Jeffrey C. Miller, Daniel H. Janzen, Winifred Hallwachs, 100 Caterpillars
2007: Kevin Starr, Steve Roper, Glen Denny, Yosemite in the Sixties
2007: Stephen Brown, Arctic Wings: Birds of the Arctic National Wildlife Refuge
2008: Susan Hallsten McGarry, Bruce Aiken (paintings), Bruce Aiken's Grand Canyon:  An Intimate Affair
2008: Ed Cooper, Soul of the Heights: 50 Years Going to the Mountains
2009: Lars Jonsson, Lars Jonsson's Birds
2010: David A. Patterson, Matt Patterson (illus.), Freshwater Fish of the Northeast
2011: Kate Davis, Rob Palmer, Nick Dunlop, Raptors of the West Captured in Photographs
2012: David J. Hall, Beneath Cold Seas: The Underwater Wilderness of the Pacific Northwest
2013: Brian B. King, The Appalachian Trail: Celebrating America's Hiking Trail
2013: David Liittschwager, A World in One Cubic Foot: Portraits of Biodiversity
2014: Bruce L. Smith, Life on the Rocks:  A Portrait of the American Mountain Goat (tied)
2014: Andy Anderson (photography), Tom Rosenbauer (essays), Salt: Coastal and Flats Fishing (tied)
2015: Thomas D. Mangelsen (photo) and Todd Wilkinson (text), The Last Great Wild Places: Forty Years of Wildlife Photography by Thomas D. Mangelsen
2016: Gerrit Vyn (photo), Jane Jeszeck (design), The Living Bird: 100 Years of Listening to Nature
2016: Tom Adler and Evan Backes (design), Dean Fidelman (photo editing), Yosemite in the Fifties: The Iron Age
2016: Todd Reed, Brad Reed, Todd and Brad Reed’s Michigan: Wednesdays in the Mitten
2017: David Yarrow, Wild Encounters: Iconic Photographs of the World’s Vanishing Animals and Cultures
2018: Kathy Love, Noppadol Paothong (photo), Stephanie Thurber and Susan Ferber (design), Sage Grouse: Icon of the West
2019: Pete McBride (photos and text), Susi Oberhelman (design), The Grand Canyon: Between River and Rim.
2020: Rob Badger and Nita Winter: Beauty and the Beast: California Wildflowers and Climate Change
2021: Chase Reynolds Ewald (essay),  Audrey Hall (photography), Bison: Portrait of an Icon
2022: QT Luong, Our National Monuments: America’s Hidden Gems
2022: Jenny deFouw Geuder, Drawn to Birds: A Naturalist’s Sketchbook

Instructional
1997: Jonathan Hanson, Roseann Hanson, Ragged Mountain Press Guide to Outdoor Sports
1998: Duane Raleigh, Knots and Ropes for Climbers
1999: Mark F. Twight, James Martin, Extreme Alpinism: Climbing Light, Fast and High
2000: Mark Harvey, The National Outdoor Leadership School's Wilderness Guide
2001: Tom Rosenbauer, Rod Walinchus (illus.), Henry Ambrose (photo), The Orvis Fly-Tying Guide
2002: Shelley Johnson, The Complete Sea Kayaker's Handbook
2002: Paul Deegan, The Mountain Traveller's Handbook
2003: Jon Rounds, Wayne Dickert, Skip Brown (photo), Taina Litwak (illus.), Basic Canoeing: All the Skills and Tools You Need to Get Started
2004: Craig Luebben, Rock Climbing: Mastering the Basic Skills
2005: Andy Tyson, Mike Clelland (illus.), Michael Kennedy (ed.), Glacier Mountaineering:  An Illustrated Guide to Glacier Travel and Crevasse Rescue
2005: Wayne Dickert, Jon Rounds, Skip Brown (photo), Roberto Sabas (illus.), Basic Kayaking:  All the Skills and Gear You Need to Get Started
2006: Scott Graham, Extreme Kids: How to Connect with Your Children Through Today's Extreme (and not so extreme) Outdoor Sports
2007: Tim Brink, The Complete Mountain Biking Manual
2008: Guy Andrews, Road Bike Maintenance
2008: Ken Whiting, Kevin Varette, Whitewater Kayaking: The Ultimate Guide
2009: Katie Brown, Ben Moon (photo), Girl on the Rocks: A Woman's Guide to Climbing with Strength, Grace and Courage
2010: Andrew Bisharat, Sport Climbing: From Top Rope to Redpoint, Techniques for Climbing Success
2011: Robin Barton, The Cycling Bible: The Complete Guide for all Cyclists from Novice to Expert
2012: Jerry Monkman, AMC Guide to Outdoor Digital Photography: Creating Great Nature and Adventure Photos
2012: Kristin Hostetter, Backpacker Magazine's Complete Guide to Outdoor Gear Maintenance and Repair: Step by Step Techniques to Maximize Performance and Save Money
2013: Mike Zawaski, Snow Travel: Skills for Climbing, Hiking, and Moving Across Snow
2014: Steve House, Scott Johnston, Training for the New Alpinism:  A Manual for the Climber as Athlete
2014: Yvon Chouinard, Craig Mathews and Mauro Mazzo, Simple Fly Fishing: Techniques for Tenkara and Rod & Reel
2015: Nate Ostis, NOLS River Rescue Guide
2016: Dave Hall with Jon Ulrich, Winter in the Wilderness:  A Field Guide to Primitive Survival Skills
2017: Liz Thomas, Backpacker Long Trails:  Mastering the Art of the Thru-hike
2017: Charles R. Farabee, Big Walls, Swift Waters:  Epic Stories from Yosemite Search and Rescue
2018: Molly Absolon, The Ultimate Guide to Whitewater Rafting and River Camping
2019 Steve House, Scott Johnston and Kilian Jornet, Training for the Uphill Athlete: A Manual for Mountain Runners and Ski Mountaineers
2020: Maria Hines and Mercedes Pollmeier: Peak Nutrition: Smart Fuel for Outdoor Adventure
2020: Pete Whittaker: Crack Climbing: The Definitive Guide
2021: [no award]

Nature guidebook
1997: Mark Stensaas, Jeff Sonstegard (illus.), Canoe Country Flora
1998: Alan Tennant, A Field Guide to Snakes of Florida
1998: Stephen R. Jones, Ruth Carol Cushman, Colorado Nature Almanac
1999: James Halfpenny, Todd Telander (illus.), Dana Kim-Wincapaw (design), Scats and Tracks of the Rocky Mountains: A Field Guide to the Signs of 70 Wildlife Species
2000: Kate Wynne & Malia Schwartz, Garth Mix (illus.), Guide to Marine Mammals & Turtles of the U.S. Atlantic and Gulf of Mexico
2001: Jeffrey Glassberg, Butterflies Through Binoculars: A Field Guide to the Butterflies of Western North America
2001: Scott Weidensaul, The Raptor Almanac:  A Comprehensive Guide to Eagles, Hawks, Falcons, and Vultures
2002: Irwin M. Brodo, Sylvia Duran Sharnoff, Stephen Sharnoff, Lichens of North America
2002: Mark Elbroch, Eleanor Marks, Bird Tracks & Sign: A Guide to North American Species
2003: Mark Elbroch, Mammal Tracks and Sign: A Guide to North American Species
2003: Milton S. Love, Mary Yoklavich, Lyman Thorsteinson, The Rockfishes of the Northeast Pacific
2004: Kurt Mead, Dragonflies of the North Woods
2005: Whit Gibbons, Mike Dorcas, Snakes of the Southeast 
2005: Laura Riley, William Riley, Nature's Strongholds: The World's Great Wildlife Reserves
2006: Charissa Reid, Yellowstone Expedition Guide: The Modern Way to Explore America's Oldest National Park
2006: David L. Wagner, Caterpillars of Eastern North America
2007: Robin L. Restall, Clemencia Rodner, Miguel Lentino, Birds of Northern South America: An Identification Guide
2008: Tomas S. Schulenberg, Douglas F. Stotz, Daniel F. Lane, John P. O'Neill, Theodore A. Parker III, Birds of Peru
2009: Roger Tory Peterson, Peterson Field Guide to Birds of North America
2009: Dennis Paulson, Dragonflies and Damselflies of the West*2010: Charley Eiseman, Noah Charney, Tracks and Sign of Insects and Other Invertebrates: A Guide to North American Species
2010: Jonathan Poppele, Night Sky: A Field Guide to the Constellations
2010: Steven N. G. Howell, Molt in North American Birds
2011: Mary Holland, Naturally Curious: A Photographic Field Guide Through the Fields, Woods and Marshes of New England 
2012: Noble S. Proctor, Patrick J. Lynch, A Field Guide to the Southeast Coast & Gulf of Mexico
2013: Jeffrey E. Belth, Butterflies of Indiana: A Field Guide
2013: Richard Crossley, Jerry Liguori and Brian Sullivan, The Crossley ID Guide: Raptors
2013: Kurt F. Johnson, The Field Guide to Yellowstone and Grand Teton National Parks
2014: Tom Stephenson, Scott Whittle, The Warbler Guide
2015: Kate Wynne and Garth Mix (illus.), Guide to Marine Mammals and Turtles of the U.S. Pacific
2015: Arthur V. Evans, Beetles of Eastern North America
2016: Teresa Marrone and Walt Sturgeon, Mushrooms of the Northeast: A Simple Guide to Common Mushrooms
2016: Louis D. Druehl and Bridgette E. Clarkston, Pacific Seaweeds:  A Guide to the Common Seaweeds of the West Coast
2017: Mike Krebill, The Scout's Guide to Wild Edibles
2017: James L. Monroe, David M. Wright, Butterflies of Pennsylvania:  A Field Guide
2018: Robert Michael Pyle, Caitlin C. LaBar, Butterflies of the Pacific Northwest
2019 Jeffrey H. Skevington and Michelle M. Locke, Field Guide to the Flower Flies of Northeastern North America 
2019: Laura Cotterman, Damon Waitt and Alan Weakley, Wildflowers of the Atlantic Southeast
2020: Douglas Kent: Foraging Southern California: 118 Nutritious, Tasty and Abundant Foods
2021: Patrick J. Lynch, A Field Guide to the Mid-Atlantic Coast
2022 Olivia Messinger Carril and Joseph S. Wilson,   Common Bees of Eastern North America

Outdoor adventure guidebook
1997: [no award]
1998: Tom Lorang Jones, John Fielder (photo), Colorado's Continental Divide Trail
1999: John Ross, Jeff Wincapaw (art dir.), Trout Unlimited's Guide to America's 100 Best Trout Streams
1999: Marty Basch, Vermont and New Hampshire Winter Trails
2000: Roger Schumann, Jan Shriner, Guide to Sea Kayaking Central and Northern California
2000: Lynna Howard, Montana and Idaho's Continental Divide Trail
2001: Mark Kroese, Fifty Favorite Climbs: The Ultimate North American Tick List
2001: Bill Burnham, Mary Burnham, Hike America Virginia: An Atlas of Virginia's Greatest Hiking Adventures
2001: Matt Heid, 101 Hikes in Northern California: Exploring Mountains, Valleys, and Seashore
2002: John Mock, Kimberley O'Neil, Hiking the Sierra Nevada
2002: Michael Wood, Colby Coombs, Alaska: A Climbing Guide
2003: Marc J. Soares, 100 Hikes in Yosemite National Park
2003: Mike Woodmansee, Trekking Washington
2003: Rich Landers, 100 Hikes in the Inland Northwest: Eastern Washington, Northern Rockies, Wallowas
2004: Douglas Lorain, 100 Classic Hikes in Oregon
2005: Andrew Dean Nystrom, Top Trails Yellowstone and Grand Teton National Parks
2005: Roxanna Brook, Jared McMillen, Red Rock Canyon: A Climbing Guide
2005: Eric J. Newell, Allison J. Newell, Idaho's Salmon River: A River Runner's Guide to the River of No Return
2006: Matt Leidecker, The Middle Fork of the Salmon River: A Comprehensive Guide
2007: Tom Martin, Duwain Whitis, Guide to the Colorado River in the Grand Canyon
2008: Bill Burnham, Mary Burnham, Florida Keys Paddling Atlas
2009: Duwain Whitis, Barbara Vinson, Guide to the Green and Yampa Rivers in Dinosaur National Monument
2009: Dave Eckardt, The Guide to Baja Sea Kayaking
2010: Greg Witt, Exploring Havasupai: A Guide to the Heart of the Grand Canyon
2011: Paul W. Bauer, The Rio Grande: A River Guide to the Geology and Landscapes of Northern New Mexico
2012: Todd Martin, Grand Canyoneering: Exploring the Rugged Gorges and Secret Slots of the Grand Canyon
2013: Michael Joseph Oswald, Your Guide to the National Parks: The Complete Guide to All 58 National Parks
2014: Joe Cook, Chattahoochee River User's Guide
2015: Tim Palmer, Field Guide to Oregon Rivers
2015: Rick Weber, Muir Valley Pocket Guide
2016: Dolores Kong and Dan Ring, Hiking Acadia National Park: A Guide to the Park's Greatest Hiking Adventures
2017: Jerry and Marcy Monkman, Outdoor Adventures, Acadia National Park: Your Guide to the Best Hiking, Biking and Paddling
2018: Damon Corso, Discovering the John Muir Trail: An Inspirational Guide to America's Most Beautiful Hike
2019: Matt Johanson, Sierra Summits: A Guidet to Fifty Peak Experiences in California's Range of Light
2019:  Ann Marie Brown, 150 Nature Hot Spots in California: The Best Parks, conservation Areas and Wild Places
2020: Aaron R. Reed, The Local Angler Fly Fishing Austin & Central Texas
2020: Tracy Salcedo: Hiking Lassen Volcanic National Park: A Guide to the Park's Greatest Hiking Adventures
2021: Luc Mehl, Illustrations by Sarah K. Glaser, The Packraft Handbook:  An Instructional Guide for the Curious
2022:  James Kaiser, Rocky Mountain National Park: The Complete Guide
2022: Diana Helmuth, illustrations by Latasha Dunston, How to Suffer Outside: A Beginner’s Guide to Hiking and Backpacking

Works of significance
1997–1998: [no award]
1999: Karl Rohnke, Cowstails and Cobras II: A Guide to Games, Initiatives, Ropes Courses, & Adventure Curriculum
1999: John Hart, Walking Softy in the Wilderness: The Sierra Club Guide to Backpacking
1999: William Nealy, Kayaking: An Animated Guide of Intermediate and Advanced Whitewater Technique
1999: John Long, How to Rock Climb
1999: Derek Hutchinson, Expedition Kayaking
2000–2002: [no award]
2003: Gene Daniell, Steven D. Smith, AMC White Mountain Guide: Hiking Trails of the White Mountain National Forest
2004–2006: [no award]
2007: Ann T. Colson (ed.), Connecticut Walk Book: The Guide to the Blue-Blazed Hiking Trails of Western Connecticut
2008–2013: [no award]
2014: Robert Birkby, Fieldbook: Scouting’s Manual of Basic and Advanced Skills for Outdoor Adventure (4th edition)
2015-2021: [no award]

References

General sources
"2011 National Outdoor Book Award Winners Announced." Targeted News Service [TNS] 18 Nov. 2011. Infotrac Newsstand. GALE|A272746321. Retrieved 12 Oct. 2012.

External links
National Outdoor Book Awards, official website.

American literary awards
Outdoor literature awards
Awards established in 1997
1997 establishments in Idaho